27th & Crystal is a bus rapid transit station in Arlington, Virginia, located near the intersection of 27th Street South and Crystal Drive. The stop is along the Metroway bus rapid transit line, in a portion of the dedicated bus-only highway. It provides two-way service to southern Crystal City.

History 
27th & Crystal opened to the public as one of the original Metroway stations; the station opened for service on August 24, 2014.

Station layout
The station consists of two side platforms along a dedicated bus-only highway, which opened on April 17, 2016.

References

External links
 Official Metroway site

Buildings and structures in Arlington, Virginia
Metroway
2014 establishments in Virginia
Transport infrastructure completed in 2014
Bus stations in Virginia
Crystal City, Arlington, Virginia